Lydinolydella is a genus of tachinid flies in the family Tachinidae.

Species
Lydinolydella abbreviata (Bigot, 1889)
Lydinolydella discalis (Townsend, 1927) 
Lydinolydella metallica Townsend, 1927
Lydinolydella humeralis (Wulp, 1890)

References

Exoristinae
Diptera of North America
Diptera of South America
Tachinidae genera
Taxa named by Charles Henry Tyler Townsend